The Chupador River is a river of Paraná state in southeastern Brazil. It is a tributary of the Corumbataí River at the junction of Iretama, Barbosa Ferraz and São João do Ivaí municipalities.

See also
List of rivers of Paraná

References

Rivers of Paraná (state)